The Palazzo Luraschi is a 19th-century palace located on Corso Buenos Aires #1 in Milan, region of Lombardy, Italy.

History
The palace was commissioned by the engineer Luraschi, once administrator of the Lazzaretto of Milan, employed by the Ospedale Maggiore of Milan. He employed Angelo Galimberti to design the building in 1887, and in the courtyard used columns derived from the former Lazzaretto. The building was intended to house businesses on the ground floor, including the restaurant Puntignam (1888-1940). The exterior is rich in balconies and rough-hewn stone. The courtyard has medallions from the novel of I Promessi Sposi of which a major scene occurs in the Lazzaretto.

References

Palaces in Milan
Houses completed in 1887